The Beat That My Heart Skipped is a 2005 French neo-noir drama film directed by Jacques Audiard and starring Romain Duris. It is a remake of the 1978 American film Fingers, and tells the story of Tom, a shady realtor torn between a criminal life and his desire to become a concert pianist. The film premiered on 17 February 2005 at the Berlin Film Festival. The film was given limited release to theaters in North America and grossed $1,023,424 and $10,988,397 worldwide.

Plot
Intense young "tough" Thomas Seyr is a 28-year-old real estate broker involved in shady business deals. His business partners, Fabrice and Sami, spend much of their time ruthlessly chasing squatters and illegal immigrants out of the buildings they have procured and trying to work their way around government housing regulations. Thomas is born to this kind of work; his father, Robert, is involved in dodgy endeavors and sometimes calls upon Thomas to beat up people who refuse to pay. Tom shows a protective and defensive attitude toward his father who doesn't always appreciate what his son does for him – so much so that when his father introduces his new girlfriend to Tom, Tom undermines her to her face, and insults her to his father, insisting she is an opportunistic "whore." Later, when he tries to enlist her help to watch over his father, she tells him they broke up due to Robert changing his attitude and she is aware of Tom's backstabbing because Robert told her. Robert by this time is in danger from a Russian gangster, Minskov (Anton Yakovlev) who scammed him out of 300,000 Euros and Tom is worried for his safety.

Tom chances upon his late mother's manager, his mother having been a concert pianist until she died 8 years previously. The manager remembers him playing something when he was 20 years old, and invites him to audition for him. The opportunity rapidly takes over Tom's imagination, becoming an obsession. He finds a teacher newly emigrated to France, virtuoso Miao Lin, to help him prepare for the audition. She speaks only Chinese, Vietnamese and some English, but no French. Tom misses appointments and drops assignments while practicing piano around the clock, and having an affair with the wife of one of his promiscuous business partners. Finally Tom reaches the high standards of his teacher, but he falls apart at the audition, having stayed up all night helping his partners with a business deal. He goes to see his father only to find the apartment destroyed and his father murdered. Tom is devastated.

Two years later: Tom tests a piano onstage and gives directions to the stage manager. He drives Miao Lin to the concert hall and parks the car, when he chances to see Minskov. He follows Minskov, and takes him by surprise waiting for an elevator. They fight in the stairwell, Minskov almost shooting Tom. Tom gains the upper hand and tries to use Minskov's own gun against him, but cannot pull the trigger. Tom washes in the restroom and takes his seat in the concert hall, knuckles and shirt bloody, exchanging affectionate glances with Miao Lin at the piano. He is evidently Miao Lin's manager and partner.

Cast
 Romain Duris as Thomas Seyr
 Niels Arestrup as Robert Seyr
 Jonathan Zaccaï as Fabrice
  as Sami
 Linh Dan Pham as Miao Lin
 Jian-Zhang as Jean-Pierre (Miao Lin's friend)
 Aure Atika as Aline
 Emmanuelle Devos as Chris
  as Minskov
 Mélanie Laurent as Minskov's Girlfriend
 Sandy Whitelaw as Mr. Fox

Background
The film is a remake of James Toback's 1978 film Fingers, but it devotes more attention to the relationship between Tom and his piano teacher, Miao Lin. The idea that affection can blossom despite a language barrier is one which Jacques Audiard has raised before in Read My Lips (starring Vincent Cassel).

For the film, Duris learned to play his own piano sequences–most notably, Bach's Toccata in E minor, trained by his sister, pianist Caroline Duris, who performs on the soundtrack.

The film's French title comes from the lyrics of the Jacques Dutronc song La Fille du père Noël ("Santa Claus' Daughter"), written by Jacques Lanzmann. It translates to English as "My heart stopped beating".

Awards and nominations

Won
BAFTA Awards
Best Film not in the English Language
Berlin Film Festival
Silver Berlin Bear: Best Film Music (Alexandre Desplat)
César Awards  
Best Actor – Supporting Role (Niels Arestrup)
Best Cinematography (Stéphane Fontaine)
Best Director (Jacques Audiard) 
Best Editing (Juliette Welfling) 
Best Film
Best Music Written for a Film (Alexandre Desplat)
Best Screenplay – Adapted (Jacques Audiard and Tonino Benacquista)
Most Promising Actress (Linh Dan Pham)
French Syndicate of Cinema Critics 
Best Film
Lumières Award  
Best Film
Best Actor (Romain Duris)
 Seville European Film Festival
Golden Giraldillo to Best Film

Nominated
Berlin Film Festival
Golden Berlin Bear (Jacques Audiard)
César Awards
Best Actor – Leading Role (Romain Duris)
Best Sound (Philippe Amouroux, Cyril Holtz, Brigitte Taillandier and Pascal Villard)
European Film Awards 
Best Actor (Romain Duris)
(Audience Award) Best Director (Jacques Audiard)

References

External links
 
 
 

2005 films
Films set in Paris
French drama films
2000s French-language films
BAFTA winners (films)
Best Film César Award winners
César Award winners
Films directed by Jacques Audiard
Films featuring a Best Supporting Actor César Award-winning performance
Films whose director won the Best Director César Award
Films featuring a Best Actor Lumières Award-winning performance
Best Foreign Language Film BAFTA Award winners
Best Film Lumières Award winners
French remakes of American films
Films scored by Alexandre Desplat
Films with screenplays by Jacques Audiard
Films about pianos and pianists
2005 drama films
2000s French films